Asterix and Cleopatra is a 1968 Belgian–French animated comedy film; it is the second Asterix adventure to be made into a feature film. Overseen by Asterix creators Goscinny and Uderzo (who had no involvement in the production of the first film, Asterix the Gaul), the film is noticeably more well-produced than its predecessor, featuring far more detailed animation and a more polished soundtrack.

Asterix and Cleopatra is practically a musical, featuring three individual song sequences and a more varied score than the earlier film. Elements of satire and surreal humour (such as Cleopatra's singing lion and the engraving of Santa Claus on the pyramid wall) are prominent throughout.

Plot
After a heated argument with Julius Caesar over his lack of faith in the Egyptian people, Queen Cleopatra enters into a bet claiming that she can have a magnificent palace constructed for him in Alexandria within three months. She gives this enormous task to her best architect Numerobis (despite his shortcomings), informing him that he will be covered with gold if he succeeds or thrown to the crocodiles if he fails. Daunted and distraught, believing the task to be insurmountable without some sort of magic, Numerobis travels to Gaul to seek help from the famous druid Panoramix.

Panoramix agrees to return to Egypt with Numerobis, while Asterix and Obelix insist on accompanying them. Obelix further insists that Idefix be allowed to join the voyage and smuggles him along despite objections from Asterix. En route to Egypt, Numerobis' ship is met by a gang of pirates. Poetic justice rules the day as the pirate ship is boarded by Asterix and Obelix, who scuttle it after a largely one-sided fight. Upon reaching Egypt, it becomes clear that Numerobis is not a particularly gifted architect; in Cleopatra's words his buildings are "the laughing stock of those who don't live in them". His scheming rival Amonbofis proposes that they collaborate in order to build Caesar's palace on time and divide the reward between them; the catch being that Numerobis alone be thrown to the crocodiles should they fail. Numerobis refuses and Amonbofis swears vengeance, angered further by the injuries he sustains while negotiating Numerobis' house (which later collapses altogether).

Amonbofis raises tensions amongst the construction workers by convincing them that they are being exploited by Numerobis and encourages them to strike. To win them over and enhance their productivity, Panoramix gives the workers his magic potion which enables them to continue effortlessly with the construction of the palace. Panoramix refuses to give any to Obelix, much to his disgruntlement. Building progress becomes so rapid that the labourers exhaust their supplies of stone; Amonbofis has bribed the supplier to dump the subsequent shipment into the Nile and the Gauls are forced to escort a fleet of ships to fetch more. Sightseeing en route, the trio visit the Pyramids at Giza. In his attempt to scale the Sphinx, Obelix provides an outlandish hypothesis as to how the monument came to be without a nose. The Gauls are intercepted by Amonbofis' sidekick Krukhut, who poses as a guide with the intention of getting the Gauls lost during a tour of the Great Pyramid. Trapped deep within the pyramid, Panoramix gives Obelix his first taste of magic potion, presumably to give him the strength to break them out. The Gauls fail to negotiate the maze, but eventually escape after being heroically tracked by Idefix. Undeterred, Amonbofis and Krukhut make a further attempt to prevent the stone reaching its destination by hiring the same gang of pirates seen earlier in the film to attack the fleet on its return to Alexandria. A short second encounter with the pirates alleviates Obelix's boredom, despite their cowardly attempt at retreat. In a final effort to stop the three Gauls, Amonbofis frames them for an attempt to poison Cleopatra with the gift of a cake made from such ingredients as arsenic, strychnine and vitriol. Asterix, Obelix and Panoramix are thrown into the dungeon after the Queen's taster becomes ill from eating the cake. Panoramix carries an antidote that enables them to eat the remainder of the cake (giving the impression that it was in fact harmless) as well as curing the taster after claiming he has indigestion. The Gauls are pardoned and catch Amonbofis and Krukhut despite their attempt to hide inside Sarcophogi; their punishment is to work for Numerobis as labourers.

Cleopatra gloats over the likelihood of winning her bet to Caesar, who fears he will lose face with her should she get the better of him and instructs his spy to infiltrate the building site. Learning that the Gauls and their magic potion are involved, Caesar orders his three mercenaries, brothers, to kidnap Panoramix and knock over the cauldron for which they will receive a bag of gold. However, the oldest brother tells the other two to capture Panoramix while he knocks over the potion. While they tie up and gag Panoramix the mercenary drinks the potion and knocks over the cauldron, before overpowering his brothers and taking Panoramix to Caesar. The two mercenaries are caught by Asterix and Obelix, who learn of what has happened to Panoramix. The Mercenary returns to Caesar and is given the gold while Panoramix is imprisoned. However, he is then caught by Asterix and Obelix who learn where Panoramix is. The Mercenary is thrown away and his brothers take him away to have 'a word' with him. Asterix and Obelix promptly free Panoramix. In desperation, Caesar holds the construction site under siege and bombards the unfinished palace with boulders. Cleopatra intervenes after Asterix brings a message to her, forcing Caesar to lift the siege and despite the damage, the palace is completed on schedule. Numerobis is honoured and the Gauls are escorted home aboard Cleopatra's luxury ship, much to the displeasure of the sacred crocodiles.

Cast

Additional Voices
 Original: Jacques Bodoin, Maurice Chevit, Claude Dasset, Gérard Darrieu, Pierre Garin, Olivier Hussenot, Rodolphe Marcilly, Joel Noel, Alfred Personne, Eddy Rasimi
 English: Jean Fontaine, Alexander A. Klimenko, Lyle Joyce, George Keros, Francois Valorbe, Derry Hall, Bruce Johansen, John Rounds, Milt Mezzrow, Michael Brown, Patrick O'Hara, Jimmy Shuman, Colin Drake, Steve Waring, Paula D'Alba

Reception 
In the United Kingdom, the film was watched by 600,000 viewers on television in 2004, making it the year's second most-watched European-language film on television.

See also
 Asterix and Obelix: Mission Cleopatra - A live action adaptation starring Gerard Depardieu, Monica Bellucci, and Christian Clavier
 Gabiniani - Germanic and Gaulish soldiers in Ptolemaic Egypt during the reigns of Cleopatra VII and her father Ptolemy XII Auletes

References

External links
 AsterixNZ entry
 

1968 films
1968 animated films
Belgian animated films
1960s French-language films
French animated films
Belgian children's films
French children's films
Asterix films
Animated films based on comics
Films set in ancient Egypt
Ancient Alexandria in art and culture
Films set in ancient Alexandria
Depictions of Cleopatra on film
Depictions of Julius Caesar on film
Films scored by Gérard Calvi
Films directed by René Goscinny
Films directed by Albert Uderzo
1960s French animated films
1960s children's animated films
Films with screenplays by Pierre Tchernia